Indirect presidential elections were held in Albania on 19, 20, 27 and 28 April 2017, the eighth such elections since the collapse of the communist regime in 1991. In the first through third round, no candidates were proposed and no vote took place in the Parliament of Albania. In the fourth round, the incumbent Chairperson and former Prime Minister of Albania, Ilir Meta was elected as the seventh President of Albania with 87 votes.

The Opposition of Albania did not take part in the election, due to the general boycott of the Parliament announced during the 2017 opposition protest.

The President of Albania is elected through a secret vote and without debate by the Parliament of Albania by a majority of three-fifths majority of all its members. The Constitution of Albania sets a limit to a maximum of two terms in office. When this majority is not reached in the first round of voting, a second round takes place within seven days. If such a majority is still not reached, a third round must take place within a further period of seven days. If even in the first three rounds no candidate has attained the necessary majority, a further two rounds must be held within seven days, with the majority needed to win being reduced to an absolute majority or 50% +1 vote of the total Members of the Parliament. If after five rounds of voting no candidate has attained the necessary majority outlined for each round of voting in the Parliament, the Parliament will be dissolved and a general election must occur within 60 days.

Results 

During the first round on 19 April 2017, the second round on 20 April 2017 and the third round on 27 April 2017, no voting took place because no candidates were proposed. A three-fifths majority of 87 votes out of 140 Members of the Parliament was necessary for a candidate to be elected in the first three rounds.

At the fourth round on 28 April 2017, Ilir Meta of the Socialist Movement for Integration was elected as President of Albania, in which only an absolute majority of 71 votes out of 140 Members of the Parliament was necessary for a candidate to be elected. 87 of the members of the Parliament voted for Meta and only 2 against.

See also 
 Politics of Albania
 President of Albania

References 

2017 elections in Europe
2017 in Albania
April 2017 events in Europe
2017